Urs Kälin (born 26 February 1966) is a Swiss former alpine skier. He competed at three Winter Olympics. 

Kälin won three silver medals in Giant Slalom: at the 1991 World Championships in Saalbach, at the 1994 Winter Olympics in Lillehammer, and at 1996 World Championships in Sierra Nevada.

World Cup victories

References

External links
 

1966 births
Living people
Swiss male alpine skiers
Olympic silver medalists for Switzerland
Olympic medalists in alpine skiing
Medalists at the 1994 Winter Olympics
Alpine skiers at the 1992 Winter Olympics
Alpine skiers at the 1994 Winter Olympics
Alpine skiers at the 1998 Winter Olympics
Olympic alpine skiers of Switzerland
20th-century Swiss people